Loreen Doloris Hall (born 12 October 1967) is an English former sprinter. She won a bronze medal in the 4 × 400 metres relay at the 1985 European Junior Championships, and went on to represent Great Britain in the women's 400 metres at the 1988 Seoul Olympics.

Career
Born in Nottingham, Hall ran 53.08 secs for 400 metres as a 16-year-old at a Junior international in July 1984. She won an English Schools 200 m title in 1984, and a AAA Junior Indoor Championships 400 m title in 1985, before winning a bronze medal in the 4 × 400 metres relay at the 1985 European Junior Championships in Cottbus with teammates Georgina Honley, Lynne Robinson and Dawn Flockhart. In other junior internationals, she took a sprint sweep from 100 m to 400 m in Australia, won a 100 m in Cyprus and won a 200 m/400 m double at the Cosford Indoor Games.

Hall ran 53.69 secs to finish second at the 1987 WAAA Championships. She was the UK's number one 400 metres runner in 1987, with a season's best of 52.74. She achieved her 400 m best of 52.71 on 18 June 1988 at the Midland Championships in Birmingham. This performance ranked her third in the UK in 1988, and she earned Olympic selection. At the Seoul Olympics, she ran 53.13 in the heats, to reach the quarter-finals, where she ran 53.42.

International competitions

References

External links
 

1967 births
Living people
Athletes (track and field) at the 1988 Summer Olympics
British female sprinters
Olympic athletes of Great Britain
Place of birth missing (living people)
English female sprinters
Sportspeople from Nottingham
Olympic female sprinters